The Fritz Reuter Literary Archive (FRLA - Fritz Reuter Literaturarchiv) in Berlin, Germany collects autographs and manuscripts by 19th century authors from Mecklenburg, as well as editions of their works. The collections primarily include Fritz Reuter (1810–1874), who wrote mostly in Low German, and Ida Gräfin Hahn-Hahn (1805–1880), who wrote primarily in High German. During the 19th century, these two novelists, with Mecklenburgian roots, were counted among the most widely read authors by the German, as well as the reading public in other countries.

Founding

The Fritz Reuter Literary Archive came into being during the early 1970s, based on private initiative, and literary interest in Fritz Reuter. Its founder is Hans-Joachim Griephan, journalist and former editor, who originally hails from Mecklenburg. The archive tries to be a gathering and documenting site for Fritz Reuter, his time and his contemporaries. Included as well are authors who influenced Reuter literarily, who see themselves in the tradition of Fritz Reuter, have done research on Fritz Reuter and his time, or have written about Fritz Reuter and his works.

With its holdings and information on literature, the FRLA wants to promote Fritz Reuter studies, investigations into his life and his literary influence, and, especially, support scholarly research. The FRLA sees itself as a supplement to other institutions of Reuter reception: Fritz Reuter Gesellschaft e.V. (Fritz Reuter Society) in Neubrandenburg/Mecklenburg, Fritz Reuter-Literaturmuseum (Fritz Reuter Literary Museum) in Stavenhagen/Mecklenburg, and Reuter-Wagner-Museum in Eisenach/Thuringia.

Holdings
The holdings of the FRLA also include other significant autographs and manuscripts, especially those with ties to Mecklenburg. Beyond those holdings, FRLA includes material by Fritz Reuter and Ida Hahn-Hahn (whole editions of their works, partial editions, translations into foreign languages, essays on their lives, influences, pictures and views pertaining to them, literature of their times, collections of as well as articles from newspapers and magazines). The autographs and manuscripts of the FRLA include whole albums, pages from albums, dedications, drawings (by Fritz Reuter), letters, postcards, manuscripts as well as documents and files.

Separate holdings contain, among other items, examples of texts and other papers by the preacher and poet Ernst Theodor Johann Brückner and the Neubrandenburg Brückner Family, of Reuter’s publisher Carl Hinstorff and the Hinstorff Court Publishing House in Wismar/Mecklenburg, as well as those of Ida Countess Hahn-Hahn and Friedrich Griese.

The FRLA collections contain (in selections) material by and on:
 John Brinckman (1814–1870)
 Ernst Theodor Johann Brückner (1746–1805)
 Friedrich Griese (1890–1975)
 Klaus Groth (1819–1899)
 Ida Gräfin Hahn-Hahn (1805–1880)
 Carl Hinstorff (1811–1882)
 August Heinrich Hoffmann von Fallersleben (1798–1874)
 August Junkermann (1832–1915)
 Ludwig Pietsch (1824–1911)
 Hermann Fürst von Pückler-Muskau (1785–1871)
 Fritz Reuter (1810–1874)
 Luise Reuter (1817–1894)
 Theodor Schloepke (1812–1878)
 Otto Speckter (1807–1871)
 Johann Heinrich Voß (1751–1826)

History of literature
German literature
German-language literature
Literary archives in Germany